Trev is a masculine given name, sometimes a short form (hypocorism) of Trevor or other names. 

It may refer to:

People
 Trevor Trev Alberts (born 1970), American college sports administrator and the director of athletics and former National Football League player
 Treve Trev Broudy (born 1968), American actor and former model, victim of a violent attack possibly due to his being gay
 Lawrence "Trev" Cole, a member of the indie pop band D.I.D. (formerly Dog Is Dead)
 Trevor Cooper (born 1953), English actor
 Treverance Trev Faulk (born 1981), American former National Football League player
 Trevor McGrat, a contestant on the TV show Hell's Kitchen (U.S. season 8)
 Trevor Neal, half of the British comedy duo Trevor and Simon in the 1980s and '90s
 Trev Thoms (died 2010), British guitarist

Fictional characters
 Trev, in the 2006 animated film Happy Feet, voiced by Steve Irwin
 Trev, a recurring character on the animated TV series Bob's Burgers
 Professor Trevor Anderson, in the 2008 movie Journey to the Center of the Earth, played by Brendan Fraser
 Trevor Brown, in the Archie Comics universe
 Trev Johnson, in the Jacqueline Woodson short story "Trev"
 Trevor LeBlanc, on the TV show Army Wives
 Trevor Philips, One of the 3 GTA V protagonist voiced by Steven Ogg

See also

 Trevelyan College, Durham, known colloquially as Trevs

Masculine given names
Hypocorisms